This is a list of oldest surviving professional wrestlers. As of 2017, there are 42 living veterans from the "Golden Age of Wrestling" (1950s–1970s) over 75 years old. The last surviving wrestler from the "Pioneer Era" (1900s–1940s) was American wrestler Angelo Savoldi (born April 21, 1914, died September 13, 2013, aged ). The title of the oldest verified wrestler of all time belongs to Polish-born American wrestler Abe Coleman (1905–2007), who lived . But the oldest in the wrestling industry was promoter Harry Elliott (1904-2006) who lived 101 years, 314 days. The current oldest living in the wrestling industry is Bill Mercer from the United States. The oldest female wrestler was Princess Bonita (1919–2014), aged . But the female in the wrestling industry was Betty Wagner, the valet of Gorgeous George who lived to 98 years old in 2011.

The oldest female wrestler to have a match is Mae Young, who defeated LayCool in a WWE Raw handicap match on November 15, 2010, at the age of 87. The oldest male wrestler was Killer Kowalski, who won on an independent show in Massachusetts on March 14, 2008, at age 81.

List

Oldest wrestlers ever

Oldest female wrestlers ever

Oldest wrestlers currently living

Oldest wrestlers to ever perform 70 and over

Oldest wrestlers still wrestling

See also
 List of premature professional wrestling deaths

References

External links
Dead Wrestlers

Professional wrestlers
oldest surviving professional wrestlers
oldest surviving professional wrestlers